The 80th Mixed Brigade was a unit of the Spanish Republican Army created during the Spanish Civil War. Located on the secondary front of Andalusia, the brigade played a minor role during the war.

History 
The unit was created in February 1937 on the Jaén-Granada front from the "Granada" and "Maroto" battalions, as well as confederal militia forces from the Noalejo sector. The command of the new brigade fell to Enrique García Moreno, while the command of the General Staff was entrusted to José Gavilanes Verea. In April the 80th Mixed Brigade was assigned to the 21st Division; By then it had its headquarters in Jaén and covered the Frailes-Mures-Charilla sector.

García Moreno was briefly replaced in June 1937 by Antonio Gallego Abril, and shortly after by Carlos Cuerda Gutiérrez. He held command of the unit until January 20, 1938, when he was replaced by Manuel Galván Rodríguez.

In May 1938 one of the unit's battalions was sent as reinforcement to the Levante front, being replaced by another battalion made up of recruits. In October it was relieved of its positions by the 106th Mixed Brigade, with the 80th Mixed Brigade being subjected to a reorganization in the Martos and Torredonjimeno area. In November, it was scheduled to participate in an attack against Granada, but the operation was eventually thwarted and instead it participated alongside the 78th Mixed Brigade in an attack against the Tózar-Limones sector — which resulted in the near destruction of its 3rd battalion. It remained on the Andalusian front until the end of the war.

Controls 
 Commanders
 Enrique García Moreno;
 Antonio Gallego Abril;
 Carlos Cuerda Gutiérrez;
 Manuel Galván Rodríguez;

 Commissars
 Ángel Marcos Salas, of the  CNT;
 Severiano Rico Leal;

 Chief of Staff
 José Gavilanes Verea;

Notes

References

Bibliography
 
 
 
 

Military units and formations established in 1937
Military units and formations disestablished in 1939
Militarized anarchist formations
Mixed Brigades (Spain)
Military units and formations of the Spanish Civil War
Military history of Spain
Armed Forces of the Second Spanish Republic